B roads are numbered routes in Great Britain of lesser importance than A roads. See the article Great Britain road numbering scheme for the rationale behind the numbers allocated.

Zone 2 (3 digits)

Zone 2 (4 digits)

Notes

2
 2